Guy Callaghan (born 7 September 1970 in Hastings, Hawke's Bay) is a former butterfly swimmer from New Zealand, who competed at the 1992 Summer Olympics in Barcelona, Spain for his native country.

His biggest success came in 1995, at the second edition of the FINA World SC Championships in Rio de Janeiro, Brazil, where Callaghan won the gold medal with the Men's 4x100 Medley Relay Team. This was a New Zealand record time and was the 4th fastest time ever recorded.

See also
 List of Commonwealth Games medallists in swimming (men)

References
 

1970 births
Living people
Olympic swimmers of New Zealand
New Zealand male butterfly swimmers
Swimmers at the 1992 Summer Olympics
Commonwealth Games silver medallists for New Zealand
Swimmers from Auckland
New Zealand male freestyle swimmers
Commonwealth Games medallists in swimming
Swimmers at the 1994 Commonwealth Games
Medallists at the 1994 Commonwealth Games